Battle of Benghazi may refer to:
Battle of Benghazi (1911), part of the Italo-Turkish War, 1911-1912.
First Battle of Benghazi, part of the First Libyan Civil War, 17–20 February 2011.
Second Battle of Benghazi, part of the First Libyan Civil War, 19–20 March 2011.
Third Battle of Benghazi, part of the Second Libyan Civil War, 16 May – 29 July 2014.
Fourth Battle of Benghazi, part of the Second Libyan Civil War, 15 October 2014 – 30 December 2017.

See also
2012 Benghazi attack, assault on a U.S. diplomatic mission